Grangeburg, also known as Granger or Grangerburg, is an unincorporated community in Houston County, Alabama, United States.

History
Grangeburg was originally called Granger in honor of John Granger. The name was later changed to Grangeburg. A post office operated under the name Granger from 1882 to 1908, and under the name Grangeburg from 1917 to 1925.

References

Unincorporated communities in Houston County, Alabama
Unincorporated communities in Alabama